Radio City Revels is a 1938 American musical comedy film directed by Benjamin Stoloff and  starring Bob Burns, Jack Oakie and Ann Miller.

The film's sets were designed by the art director Van Nest Polglase. Although set in New York City, specifically at Radio City, much of the film was shot in RKO's California studios. The company had originally planned to make the film in 1934 starring Fred Astaire and Ginger Rogers. In 1937 the project was revived with a new cast.

Plot
A struggling song-writing team strike gold when an aspiring writer arrives in New York as he composes masterpieces in his sleep. They begin to appropriate his work under their own name, scoring major hits.

Cast
 Bob Burns as Lester Robin
 Jack Oakie as Harry Miller
 Kenny Baker as Kenny Baker
 Ann Miller as Billie Shaw
 Victor Moore as Paul Plummer
 Milton Berle as Teddy Jordan
 Helen Broderick as Gertie Shaw
 Jane Froman as Jane Froman
 Buster West as Squenchy
 Melissa Mason as Lisa
 Richard Lane as Crane
 Marilyn Vernon as 	Delia Robin
 Charles Coleman as The Butler 
 Don Wilson as 	Don Wilson - Radio Station Announcer
 Hal Kemp and His Orchestra as Themselves
 William Brisbane as Mr. Ipswich
 Rosalind Marquis as Singer
 Kirby Grant as Singer
 Bobby Barber as Waiter

Reception
According to RKO records, the film made a loss of $300,000. It got a mixed reception from critics at Variety and The New York Times who were negative about aspects of the film while praising the performance of rising star Ann Miller.

References

Bibliography
 Shelley, Peter. Ann Miller: Her Life and Career. McFarland, 2020.

External links
Radio City Revels at TCMDB
 

1938 films
RKO Pictures films
1938 romantic comedy films
1938 musical comedy films
American romantic musical films
American musical comedy films
American black-and-white films
1930s romantic musical films
Films directed by Benjamin Stoloff
Films set in New York City
1930s English-language films
1930s American films